Hendricks is a surname. Notable people with the surname include:

Arts and entertainment
 Barbara Hendricks (born 1948), American soprano
 Belford Hendricks, (1909-1977), American  composer, pianist, arranger, conductor and record producer.
 Christina Hendricks (born 1975 ), American actress
 Gay Hendricks (born 1945), personal growth author
 Howard Hendricks (1924-2013), author
 Jim Hendricks (1949-2018), American actor
 Jim Hendricks (musician) (born 1940), American musician
 Jon Hendricks (1921-2017), jazz vocalese artist

Politics
 Barbara Hendricks (politician) (born 1952), German politician
 Francis Hendricks (1834–1920), New York politician
 Thomas A. Hendricks (1819-1885), American Vice-President
 William Hendricks (1782-1850), Governor of Indiana, United States senator

Sports
 Ashraf Hendricks (born 1984), South African soccer player
 Carlos Hendricks (born 1983), American football player
 Clint Hendricks (born 1991), South African cyclist
 Conrad Hendricks (1979-2006), South African soccer player
 Elrod Hendricks (1940-2005), American baseball player
 Johny Hendricks (born 1983), American wrestler
 Kyle Hendricks (born 1989), American baseball player
 Kyle Hendricks (rugby union) (born 1986), South African rugby union player
 Matt Hendricks (born 1981), American ice hockey player
 Randy Hendricks (born 1945), sports agent
 Reeza Hendricks (born 1989), South African cricketer
 Ted Hendricks (born 1947), American football player
 Tommy Hendricks (born 1978), American football player

Others
 Anne Hendricks Bass (born c. 1941), American investor, documentary filmmaker, philanthropist and art collector
 Diane Hendricks (born 1947), American businesswoman and philanthropist
 Father Hendricks (1846-1906), Dutch missionary
 John Allen Hendricks (born 1970), American academic
 John R. Hendricks (1929-2007), mathematician
 Ken Hendricks (1941-2007), American businessman
 Margo Hendricks (born 1948), American academic
 Michael Hendricks, American psychologist, suicidologist, and an advocate for the LGBT community
 Susan Hendricks (born 1973), CNN presenter
 Vincent F. Hendricks (born 1970), philosopher
 William L. Hendricks (1904-1992), American film producer and charity founder

See also 

 Jimi Hendrix
 Hendric
 Hendrick (surname)
 Hendrickx
 Hendrik (disambiguation)
 Hendriks
 Hendrikx
 Hendrix (disambiguation)
 Hendryx
 Henrik
 Henry (disambiguation)
 Henryk (disambiguation)

Patronymic surnames
Surnames from given names

de:Hendricks
fr:Hendricks
nl:Hendricks